Pel or PEL may refer to:

People
 Albert Pel (born 1849), a French serial killer
 David Pel (born 1991), a Dutch tennis player
 Hendrik Pel (1818-1876), a Dutch zoologist and government official
 Pieter Klazes Pel (1852–1919), a Dutch physician

Science and technology
 PEL sector light, a projector-style marine beacon
 Pixel, pel, or picture element, is a physical point in a raster image
 Permissible exposure limit, an American legal limit for exposure to a chemical substance or physical agent 
 Peak of eternal light, a point on the surface of an astronomical body always in sunlight
 Primary effusion lymphoma, a blood cancer

Other uses
 Pel, Iran, or Pil, a village in Mazandaran Province, Iran
 PEL (Pakistan), Pak Elektron Limited, a Pakistani engineering corporation 
 Party of the European Left, a European political party
 Wood and Allied Workers' Union, a former trade union in Finland

See also

 Pels (disambiguation)